Bertsa is a genus of true bugs in the family Miridae.

Characteristics
Elongated oval shaped body, attenna with four segments. The white band on the dorsal of the insect marks the difference between this genus with others within the same tribus.

Distribution
This genus is distributed in warmer area of East Asia, South East Asia and South Asia. They have been found from Japan to South Korea, Mainland China and Hong Kong。

Species
So far only two species have been described:
 Bertsa lankana : Seen only in the warmest provinces of South Korea, southern provinces of Mainland China, Taiwan, as well as the area spanning from Indonesia to Sri Lanka.
 Bertsa major

References

External links
 Nomenclator Zoologicus

Mirini
Miridae genera